This is a list of states and territories (in italics) with a coastline on the Atlantic Ocean (including the Baltic and Mediterranean Seas) are:

Europe

 
  (POR)
 
 
 
 
 
 
 
 
  (DEN)
 
 
 
  (UK)
 
  (UK)
 
 
  (UK)
 
  (UK)
 
 
 
 
 
 
  (claimed by Cyprus)

Africa

 
 
  (NOR)
 
  (ESP)
 
 
 
 
 
 
 
 
 
 
 
  (POR)
 
 
 
 
 
  (UK)
 
 
 
 
 
 
  (claimed by Morocco)

Asia

  (claimed by Georgia)
 
 
 
 
  (claimed by Cyprus)

South America

 
 
 
 
  (UK)
  (FRA)
 
  (UK)

North and Central America

  
  
  (UK)
 
 
  (DEN)
 
 
 
 
 
  (FRA)

Caribbean

  (UK)
 
  (NED)

 
  (NED)
  (UK)
  (UK)
 
  (NED)
 
 
  (FRA)
 
 
 
  (FRA)
  (UK)
  (NED)
  (USA)
  (FRA)
 
 
  (NED)
  (FRA)
 
  (NED)
 
  (UK)
  (USA)

See also
 Macaronesia
 Atlantic Ocean
 Atlantic History

Atlantic Ocean
Bordering the Atlantic Ocean
Countries and territories